Marek Rzepka (born 6 January 1964) is a Polish former professional footballer who played as a defender.

Career 
Rzepka's biggest career club successes were with Lech Poznań, winning the title three times (1990, 1992 and 1993), the Polish Cup once (1988) and the Polish Supercup twice (1990 and 1992).

He played in 15 matches for the Poland national team from 1991 to 1993. He was the first Lech player to ever captain the national team.

References

External links 
 

1964 births
Living people
Polish footballers
Association football defenders
Poland international footballers
Wisła Płock players
Zawisza Bydgoszcz players
Lech Poznań players
GKS Tychy players
GKS Bełchatów players
Sportspeople from Płock